The 2016 Korea Open Super Series was the eighth Super Series tournament of the 2016 BWF Super Series. The tournament took place at Seong-nam Indoor Stadium in Seongnam, South Korea from September 27 – October 2, 2016, and had a total prize of $600,000.

Men's singles

Seeds

Top half

Bottom half

Finals

Women's singles

Seeds

Top half

Bottom half

Finals

Men's doubles

Seeds

Top half

Bottom half

Finals

Women's doubles

Seeds

Top half

Bottom half

Finals

Mixed doubles

Seeds

Top half

Bottom half

Finals

References

External links
 Korea Open at www.bka.kr
 BWF World Superseries at www.bwfworldsuperseries.com

Korea Open (badminton)
Korea Open
Korea Open
Sport in Seoul